Neesiochloa is a genus of Brazilian plants in the grass family. The only known species is Neesiochloa barbata. It is native to eastern Brazil (Bahia, Rio Grande do Norte, Ceará, Piauí).

The genus name of Neesiochloa is in honour of Christian Gottfried Daniel Nees von Esenbeck (1776–1858), a prolific German botanist, physician, zoologist, and natural philosopher. The Latin specific epithet of barbata refers to "barba" meaning bearded.

References

Chloridoideae
Endemic flora of Brazil
Grasses of South America
Flora of Bahia
Flora of Rio Grande do Norte
Environment of Ceará
Environment of Piauí
Monotypic Poaceae genera
Taxa named by Christian Gottfried Daniel Nees von Esenbeck
Plants described in 1840